Enterprise (or the archaic spelling Enterprize) may refer to:

Business and economics

Brands and enterprises 

 Enterprise GP Holdings, an energy holding company
 Enterprise plc, a UK civil engineering and maintenance company
 Enterprise Products, a natural gas and crude oil pipeline company
 Enterprise Records, a record label
 Enterprise Rent-A-Car, a car rental Provider
Enterprise Holdings, the parent company

General 

 Business, economic activity done by a businessperson
 Big business, larger corporation commonly called "enterprise" in business jargon (excluding small and medium-sized businesses)
 Company, a legal entity practicing a business activity
 Enterprises in the Soviet Union, the analog of "company" in the former socialist state
 Enterprise architecture, a strategic management discipline within an organization
 Enterprise Capital Fund, a type of venture capital in the UK
 Entrepreneurship, the practice of starting new organizations, particularly new businesses
 Social enterprise, an organization that applies commercial strategies to improve well-being
United Kingdom enterprise law, the regulation of businesses and public sector bodies within the economic constitution

Organizations 

 Enterprize Canada, a student-run entrepreneurial competition and conference
 Enterprise for High School Students, a non-profit organization

Computing 

 Enterprise (computer), a 1980s UK 8-bit home computer, also known as Flan and Elan
 Enterprise resource planning (ERP), integrated management of core business processes or the technology supporting such management
 Enterprise software, business-oriented computer applications
 Enterprise storage, for large businesses
 Windows Enterprise, an edition of several versions of Microsoft Windows

Entertainment and media

Television 

 Star Trek: Enterprise, also Enterprise, a 2001-2005 television series
 Enterprise (soundtrack), a 2002 soundtrack album from the first season of the series
 Enterprice (British TV series), a 2018 television series

Fictional entities

Star Trek vessels 

 Starship Enterprise, a list, timeline and brief description of starships in the fictional history of Star Trek
 Enterprise (NX-01),  the main setting of Star Trek: Enterprise
 USS Enterprise (NCC-1701), from the original Star Trek television series and several Star Trek films
 USS Enterprise (NCC-1701-A),from the fourth, fifth and sixth Star Trek films
 USS Enterprise (NCC-1701-B), from the film Star Trek: Generations
 USS Enterprise (NCC-1701-C), from the Star Trek: Next Generation episode "Yesterday's Enterprise"
 USS Enterprise (NCC-1701-D), from Star Trek: The Next Generation
 USS Enterprise (NCC-1701-E), from the films Star Trek: First Contact, Star Trek: Insurrection, and Star Trek: Nemesis
 USS Enterprise (NCC-1701-F), a non-player ship in the Star Trek Online video game
 USS Enterprise (NCC-1701-J),  from the Star Trek: Enterprise episode "Azati Prime"

Other fictional vessels 
 Enterprise, an airship in the game Final Fantasy IV
 Enterprise, an airship in the game Final Fantasy XIV
 Enterprise, the title ship in the 1959–1961 television series Riverboat
 Enterprise, a starship in H. Beam Piper's novel Space Viking

Newspapers 

Australia

 The Enterprise (Katoomba), in Katoomba, New South Wales (1913)

United States

 Bastrop Daily Enterprise, in Louisiana
 Chico Enterprise-Record, in Chico, California
 High Point Enterprise, in North Carolina
 The Beaumont Enterprise, in Texas
 The Enterprise (Brockton), in Brockton, Massachusetts
 The Enterprise (Omaha), in Nebraska (1893–1914)
 Malheur Enterprise, in Malheur County, Oregon
 The Press-Enterprise, in Riverside, California (1885–1983)

Geographic locations

Canada 

 Enterprise, Northwest Territories, a hamlet
 Enterprise, a hamlet in the township of Stone Mills, Ontario
 Rural Municipality of Enterprise No. 142, Saskatchewan

United States 

 Enterprise, Alabama, a city
 Enterprise, California (disambiguation)
 Enterprise, Florida, an unincorporated community
 Enterprise, Indiana, an unincorporated community
 Enterprise, Iowa, an unincorporated community
 Enterprise, Kansas, a city
 Enterprise, Louisiana, an unincorporated community
 Enterprise, Minnesota, an abandoned townsite
 Enterprise, Clarke County, Mississippi, a town
 Enterprise, Union County, Mississippi, an unincorporated community
 Enterprise, Linn County, Missouri, an unincorporated community
 Enterprise, McDonald County, Missouri, a ghost town
 Enterprise, Shelby County, Missouri, an unincorporated community
 Enterprise, Nevada, a census-designated place
 Enterprise, Ohio (disambiguation)
 Enterprise, Oklahoma, a census-designated place
 Enterprise, Oregon, a city
 Enterprise, Utah, a city
 Enterprise, Morgan County, Utah, a census-designated place
 Enterprise, West Virginia, a census-designated place in Harrison County
 Enterprise, Wirt County, West Virginia, an unincorporated community
 Enterprise (community), Wisconsin, an unincorporated community
 Enterprise, Wisconsin, a town
 Enterprise Rancheria in California
 Enterprise Township, Michigan
 Enterprise Township, Jackson County, Minnesota
 Enterprise Township, Valley County, Nebraska

Other places 

 Enterprise, Guyana, a village
 Enterprise, Trinidad and Tobago
 Enterprise Rupes, an escarpment on Mercury

Vehicles

Aircraft 

 Enterprise (balloon), a gas-inflated aerial reconnaissance balloon used by the Union Army during the American Civil War
 Enterprise, a US Navy L-class blimp
 Enterprise, an Armstrong Whitworth Ensign plane

Spacecraft 

 IXS Enterprise, a NASA conceptual interstellar ship
 Space Shuttle Enterprise
 VSS Enterprise, the inaugural vessel of the Virgin Galactic suborbital tourism fleet

Trains 

 Enterprise (train service), between Belfast and Dublin
 Enterprise (Via Rail train), a former service between Montreal and Toronto
 Enterprise, an LNER Class A1/A3 locomotive

Watercraft

United States Navy ships 

(Chronological)

 , a Continental Navy sloop captured from the British, burned to prevent recapture in 1777
 , a schooner that fired the first shots in the First Barbary War
 , a schooner, stationed primarily in South America to patrol and protect commerce
 , a steam-powered sloop-of-war used for surveying, patrolling, and training until 1909
 , a motorboat (1917–1919) used in World War I as a non-commissioned section patrol craft
  (1936), a Yorktown-class aircraft carrier, and the most decorated U.S. Navy ship
  (1961), the world's first nuclear-powered aircraft carrier
  (2027), a planned Gerald R. Ford-class aircraft carrier

Royal Navy ships 

(Chronological)

  was a 24-gun sixth rate, previously the French frigate , captured in May 1705.  She was wrecked in October 1707.
  was a 44-gun fifth rate launched in 1709. She underwent a great repair in 1718–19, was hulked in 1740 and fitted as a hospital ship in 1745 before being sold in 1749.
 , a 44-gun frigate, was to have been named Enterprise, but was renamed five months before her launch in 1741.
  was an 8 gun sloop captured from the Spanish in 1743. She was employed solely in the Mediterranean as a dispatch vessel and tender, and was sold in 1748 at Minorca.
She was renamed Enterprise in 1744 as a 44-gun fifth rate and was broken up in 1771.
  was a 28-gun  sixth-rate frigate launched in August 1774, on harbour service from 1790 and broken up in 1807.
  was a 10-gun tender captured by the Americans in 1775, see USS Enterprise (1775).
Resource was rebuilt as a 22-gun floating battery in 1804, renamed Enterprise in 1806 and sold in 1816.
  was a wooden paddle gunvessel purchased in 1824 and in service until 1830.
  was a survey sloop launched in 1848, used as a coal hulk from 1860 and sold in 1903.
 HMS Enterprise was to have been a wooden screw sloop. She was laid down in 1861, renamed HMS Circassian in 1862 but cancelled in 1863.
  was an ironclad sloop ordered as HMS Circassian, but renamed in 1862.  She was launched in 1864 and sold in 1884.
  was an  light cruiser launched in 1919 and sold in 1946.
  was an  inshore survey ship launched in 1958 and sold in 1985.
  is an  multi-role survey vessel (hydrographic/oceanographic) launched in 2002 and currently in service.

Other ships 

 , a J-class yacht involved in the America's Cup
 , a schooner, previously a privateer, used by the Continental Navy in Chesapeake Bay until 1777
 , steamboat that delivered supplies and troops during the Battle of New Orleans and was the first to ascend the Mississippi and Ohio rivers
 , an Australian topsail schooner used for the founding of Melbourne, Australia
 , a replica of the 1829 Enterprize
 , forced by weather into Bermuda in 1835, resulting in the liberation of most of the slaves on board
 , a Canadian 19th-century steamer on the Columbia and Fraser rivers
 , a sidewheeler, built in San Francisco, operated on the Fraser River system, from 1861 to her loss in 1885
 , a Canadian pioneer sternwheeler on the upper Fraser River
 PS Enterprise, an 1878 Australian paddle steamer on the Murray, Darling and Murrumbidgee Rivers
 , an American steamboat that operated on the Willamette River in Oregon
 Enterprise, a sailing ship caught in a storm off St. Ives, Cornwall in 1903
 London Enterprise (1950), an oil tanker built for London & Overseas Freighters, scrapped 
 London Enterprise (1983), a Panamax oil tanker built for London & Overseas Freighters
  (1944–1952), an American cargo ship originally commissioned as the SS Cape Kumukaki (C1-B)
 , see Boats of the Mackenzie River watershed

Ship classes 

 , a class of sailboat
 Discoverer Enterprise, the namesake of a class of deepwater drillships

Other uses 
 Enterprise (apple)
 Enterprise (horse), a British Thoroughbred racehorse
 Enterprise (ride), an amusement ride
 Enterprise Cup, an annual rugby union competition in Kenya, Tanzania and Uganda
 Enterprise MRT station, an upcoming MRT station on the Jurong Region line in Singapore
 Enterprise number, a former type of US business phone number which would automatically accept a collect call
 USS Enterprise (BLDG 7115), a U.S. Navy Recruit Barracks named in honor of the Navy's Enterprise ships
 "The Enterprise", a secret operation carried out by senior officials of the Reagan administration, used to identify the perpetrators of the Iran-Contra affair.

See also 

 Enterprise Building (disambiguation)
 Business (disambiguation)
 Enterprise High School (disambiguation)
 Entreprenant (disambiguation), the French word for enterprising and the name of several sailing vessels
 Entreprise, a variant spelling and the name of several sailing vessels
 Free enterprise (disambiguation)
 USS Enterprise (disambiguation)